Pierre Gignoux (born May 19, 1967) is a French ski mountaineer.

Gignoux was born in Grenoble and competed first in the Trans Mont Blanc race in 1994. Since 1995 he has been member of the French national team.

Together with Stéphane Brosse he has held the ski mountaineering record on the Mont Blanc since May 30, 2003 with a total time of 5 hours 15 minutes 47 seconds. Amongst others, he won three times the European Cup and four times the French Championships.

Gignoux enjoys also mountaineering, cross-country skiing, paragliding and street as well as mountain bicycle racing.

Selected results 
 1997:
 2nd, French national ranking
 1998:
 2nd, French national ranking
 1999:
 1st, European Championship team race (together with Francis Bibollet)
 1st, French national ranking
 2000:
 1st, French national ranking
 5th (and 3rd in "seniors I" class ranking), Patrouille des Glaciers (together with Francis Bibollet and Stéphane Brosse)
 2001:
 1st, European Championship team race (together with Stéphane Brosse)
 1st, French national ranking
 1st, Trophée des Gastlosen (European Cup, together with Stéphane Brosse)
 2002:
 1st, Tour du Rutor (together with Stéphane Brosse)
 5th, World Championship team race (together with Stéphane Brosse)
 2003:
 1st, Dolomiti Cup team (together with Stéphan Brosse)
 4th, European Championship team race (together with Stéphane Brosse)
 2004:
 1st, Transcavallo race (together with Stéphane Brosse)
 2008:
 8th, World Championship team race (together with Alexandre Pellicier)

Pierra Menta 

 1995: 5th, together with Olivier Pasteur
 1996: 4th, together with Francis Bibollet
 1997: 2nd, together with Yvan Brondex
 1998: 2nd, together with Yvan Brondex
 1999: 2nd, together with Francis Bibollet
 2000: 2nd, together with Francis Bibollet
 2001: 1st, together with Stéphane Brosse
 2002: 2nd, together with Stéphane Brosse
 2003: 2nd, together with Stéphane Brosse

Trofeo Mezzalama 

 1999: 2nd, together with Fabio Meraldi and Enrico Pedrini
 2003: 2nd, together with Stéphane Brosse and Jean Pellissier

References

External links 
 Pierre Gignoux' shop website
 Pierre Gignoux at SkiMountaineering.org

1967 births
Living people
French male ski mountaineers
Sportspeople from Grenoble
21st-century French people
20th-century French people